Mo Ji-soo (Hangul: 모지수; born 3 June 1969) is a South Korean short track speed skater, who won a gold medal in the 5000 m relay at the 1992 Winter Olympics together with teammates Kim Ki-hoon, Lee Joon-ho, and Song Jae-kun.

References

External links
 Database Olympics

1969 births
Living people
South Korean male short track speed skaters
Olympic short track speed skaters of South Korea
Olympic gold medalists for South Korea
Olympic medalists in short track speed skating
Short track speed skaters at the 1992 Winter Olympics
Medalists at the 1992 Winter Olympics
Asian Games medalists in short track speed skating
Short track speed skaters at the 1990 Asian Winter Games
Dankook University alumni
Medalists at the 1990 Asian Winter Games
Asian Games gold medalists for South Korea
Universiade silver medalists for South Korea
Universiade bronze medalists for South Korea
Universiade medalists in short track speed skating
Competitors at the 1989 Winter Universiade
Competitors at the 1991 Winter Universiade
20th-century South Korean people